Yevgeniy Chernukhin (born 2 March 1984) is a Belarusian professional football coach and a former player.

In December 2020 he was appointed as a head coach of FC Vitebsk.

References

External links
 

1984 births
Living people
Sportspeople from Vitebsk
Association football midfielders
Belarusian footballers
FC Vitebsk players
FC Orsha players
Belarusian football managers
FC Vitebsk managers